Hazel McBride (born 24 March 1949) is a British actress known for her role as Madeleine Duclos in the BBC television drama series Secret Army.

McBride became involved in amateur dramatics while reading history at Bristol University and her first professional engagement was working in a children's theatre company in Glasgow before her work for repertory theatres around the UK.

With a solid list of theatre credits including runs in the West End and Bristol Old Vic, McBride began to make appearances in television dramas in the 1970s before gaining the role of Madeleine in Secret Army, appearing in its second and third series in 1978 and 1979.

After the series ended its run, McBride continued her acting career mostly in theatre and television. She was interviewed about her time on Secret Army for the special features of the third series DVD release in 2004.

As of 2010, she is the director of School English Scene, a theatre company created to support English teaching in British secondary schools. In this capacity, she has written, produced, and directed.

Selected TV credits

References

External links

1949 births
Living people
English stage actresses
English television actresses